Phyteuma betonicifolium, common name betony-leaved rampion, is a species of flowering plant in the family Campanulaceae.

Etymology
The generic name (Phyteuma) derives from the Greek word "phyto" (= plant) and means: "what is planted", while the specific epithet (betonicifolium) means "with betonic leaves" (Betonica or Stachys is a genus of plants of the Lamiaceae family).

Subspecies
Subspecies include: 
Phyteuma betonicifolium betonicifolium Vill.Phyteuma betonicifolium scaposum (R. Schulz)

Distribution

Phyteuma betonicifolium occurs from France, Switzerland to Italy and from Germany to Austria to the former Yugoslavia.

Habitat
This species can be found in the Alps in subalpine to alpine zones at altitudes of 1000 to 2700 meters. It is fairly common and thrives in meadows, pastures and scrub.

Description
The stem is erect and simple, the upper third is usually glabrous. 

The basal leaves are long-stalked and their leaf blade is heart-shaped or rounded at the base, sharply and bluntly toothed and three to eight times as long as wide. The upper stem leaves are narrow-lanceolate and sessile. The underground part is a rhizome. 

The  light blue-violet flowers are fivefold. The  inflorescence is ovate-cylindrical. The bracts are narrow - lanceolate. The flowering period extends from June to August. The fruit is a capsule containing numerous small seeds.

Bibliography 
 Elias Landolt: Unsere Alpenflora. 5. Auflage 1984, ISBN 3-85902-045-5.

External links
Flora von Deutschland 
 Biolib
 Acta Plantarum
 Schede di botanica

References

Campanuloideae